Aux chemins de Babo Naki is a collection of poetry by Josué Guébo, prefaced by Séry Bailly. Published in 2016, the book receives the following year, the Bernard Dadié national grand prize for literature;.

Theme 
The main theme of  Aux chemins de Babo Naki is based on the strength of the union and solidarity, the need for social cohesion and peace.

Summary 
Aux chemins de Babo Naki, based on a krou myth, tells the story of Babo Naki, a hunter whose death in the bush brings his seven sons, each bearing a specific talent, to pool their skills and expertise: Guibrénipi the geographer, Guenakô the osteologist, Blakou the dermatologist, Pamadrou the hematologist, Pamagnomou the pulmonologist, Diwéri the master of speech and Vouka the physiotherapist.

They succeed in bringing their father back to life. However, when the moment comes to determine which of them has played the most decisive role in the résurrection of the father, the situation degenerates into an argument.

Style 
This collection of poetry, a midway between the story, the myth and the allegory is presented through some frequencies of the suggestion. The text reveals a writing with intense and varied colors.

Literary Award 
 Bernard Dadié national grand prize for literature, 2017.

Edition 
 Aux chemins de Babo Naki, Harmattan, 2016,

References

External links
Sila 2017: Josué Guebo «Aux chemins de Babo Naki» Grand Prix National Bernard Dadie de littérature
Carrefour du Livre - Aux chemins de Babo Naki (Josué Guébo)

African poetry
Postcolonial poetry